Aliabad-e Shur (also Romanized as ‘Alīābād-e Shūr; also known as ‘Alīābād) is a village in Rostaq Rural District, in the Central District of Neyriz County, Fars Province, Iran. At the 2006 census, its population was 190, in 42 families.

References 

Populated places in Neyriz County